A list of films produced in France in 1964.

See also
 1964 in France

Notes

References

External links
 French films of 1964 at the Internet Movie Database
French films of 1964 at Cinema-francais.fr

1964
Films
French